Marshall High School and variants may refer to:

Marshall High School (Arkansas), Marshall, Arkansas
Marshall High School (Illinois), Marshall, Illinois
East Marshall Senior High School, Le Grand, Iowa
West Marshall High School, State Center, Iowa
Marshall County High School (Kentucky), Draffenville, Kentucky
Marshall High School (Michigan), Marshall, Michigan
Marshall County Central High School, Newfolden, Minnesota
Marshall High School (Minnesota), Marshall, Minnesota
Marshall School, Duluth, Minnesota
S.V. Marshall High School, Holmes County, Mississippi
Marshall Senior High School (Missouri), Marshall, Missouri
Marshall High School (Marshall, North Carolina), listed on the NRHP in North Carolina
Marshall High School (Bend, Oregon), Bend, Oregon
Marshall High School (Portland, Oregon). Portland, Oregon
Marshall County High School (Tennessee), Lewisburg, Tennessee
Marshall High School (Texas), Marshall, Texas
George C. Marshall High School, Idylwood, Virginia
Marshall High School (Wisconsin), Marshall, Dane County, Wisconsin

John Marshall High School
John Marshall High School (Los Angeles), California
John Marshall Metropolitan High School, Chicago, Illinois
John Marshall Community High School (Indiana), Indianapolis, Indiana
John Marshall High School (Minnesota), Rochester, Minnesota
John Marshall High School (New York), Rochester, New York
John Marshall High School (Ohio), Cleveland, Ohio
John Marshall High School (Oklahoma), Oklahoma City, Oklahoma
John Marshall High School (Leon Valley, Texas)
John Marshall High School (Virginia), Richmond, Virginia
John Marshall High School (West Virginia), Glen Dale, West Virginia
John Marshall High School (Wisconsin), Milwaukee, Wisconsin

See also
 Thurgood Marshall High School (disambiguation)